Spectrum is a 1999 album by West Coast hip hop collective Quannum. It was the first release on the Quannum Projects label after its name was changed from SoleSides. The album features guest appearances and contributions from Jurassic 5, Divine Styler, Souls of Mischief, and El-P.

Track listing

Charts

References

External links
 

1999 compilation albums
Quannum Projects compilation albums
Hip hop compilation albums